René Stadtkewitz (born 9 January 1965) is a German right-wing politician. A former local Berlin politician of the Christian Democratic Union (CDU) and anti-Islam activist, he co-founded the German Freedom Party in 2010, which he led until 2013. He has also been deputy chairman of the Citizens' Movement Pax Europa.

Biography

Early life
Stadtkewitz was born in East Berlin. From 1981 to 1984, he completed vocational training as a metallurgist for rolling mill technology. From 1984 to 1986 he completed his basic military service. He states that he refused to work at the border and was therefore harassed by the Stasi. He has said that "I was done with the GDR when I was 21". From 1986 to 1991 Stadtkewitz worked in industrial robot construction. In the year the Wall fell, he fled with his family via Hungary from the GDR to the Federal Republic of Germany. After reunification he returned to Berlin.

Political career and arson attack
Stadtkewitz became a member of the Christian Democratic Union (CDU) in 1995, and represented the party locally in the state parliament of Berlin from 2001 to 2010. On the night of 10 August 2006, an arson attack was carried out on Stadtkewitz and his family in their house. A Molotov cocktail was thrown into an open basement window, setting a mattress on fire. Stadtkewitz and his wife got the two sleeping children out of their beds and fled outside. Stadtkewitz had been threatened a few months earlier. In three letters he was told that "the family would be at risk" if he did not give up his opposition to the construction of the Khadija Mosque and did not resign his mandate as a member of parliament. State security took up the investigation because a political background could not be ruled out. The CDU politicians Friedbert Pflüger and Frank Henkel and the state and parliamentary group leaders of the Berlin CDU declared their solidarity with Stadtkewitz. The perpetrators were not identified.

Stadtkewitz had campaigned against the construction of the Khadija Mosque of the Ahmadiyya Muslim Jamaat in Berlin-Heinersdorf. He supported a citizens' initiative and took part in several demonstrations against the construction of the mosque. At the closing rally of the demonstration on 11 July 2007, he gave a speech in which he described Islam as a "political religion" that "cannot be integrated into Europe".

German Freedom Party
Stadtkewitz was expelled from the CDU in 2010 after inviting Dutch anti-Islam politician Geert Wilders to hold a speech. He then founded the German Freedom Party. The same year he was part of an initiative with international politicians Heinz-Christian Strache, Kent Ekeroth and Filip Dewinter in Jerusalem that declared their support for Israel against Islamic terrorism. He also attended an international counter-jihad conference in Paris the same year. 

In 2013 he stepped down as leader of the party and instead called on his supporters to vote for the new Alternative for Germany (AfD), while Michael Stürzenberger became new leader. After comparing the parties' political programmes Stadtkewitz concluded that they overlapped 90 percent. After several hundred new members from the party joined AfD, the AfD's then-leader Bernd Lucke however declared a ban on new admissions from the party. 

In 2015 Stadtkewitz held a speech at a Pegida rally where he intensified its thrust of criticism of Islam by characterising Islam as a politically totalitarian ideology.

References

Living people
1965 births
Counter-jihad activists
Leaders of political parties in Germany
German critics of Islam